Mada is a term used in both Hindu theology and mythology. It is one of the Arishadvargas. It refers to one of the six enemy of the mind or a vice according to the Hindu scriptures. It is the Hindu equivalent of Pride from the seven deadly sins from the Christian Theology.

Hindu theology
According to the Hindu theology, it signifies negative attributes such as "arrogance, excessive pride, obstinacy, stubborn mindedness". It is seen as a major obstacle to attaining moksha, or salvation. If one bears mada towards another person, they cannot attain moksha. The presence of Mada in a person leads to ignorance which in turn leads to the corruption of the mind. According to Hindu scriptures, mada is often manifested due to a variety of reasons.

Hindu mythology
In Hindu mythology, Mada is a gigantic Rakshasa (demon or monster) from the Hindu text, Mahabharata. It is created by sage Chyavana in response to the Aswins returning his youth and vision. Mada's name (मद) means the intoxicator, his strength being feared by the king of devas, Indra. It has the ability to change its size, able to grow big enough to swallow the entire universe in one gulp.

When the Aswins wished to become completely immortal by drinking Soma (the elixir of immortality), they were insulted to discover that Indra had not invited them to his party at Svarga. The twins rushed to speak with Indra, who refused both Soma and access to Svagra, on the basis that they associated with mortals and changed form too freely. Following this, they sought the assistance of the great sage Chyavana.

Chyavana started to prepare a sacrifice in the name of the Aswins. This enraged Indra, who planned to attack Chyavan with a mountain in one hand and a thunderbolt in the other, refusing to acknowledge the twins as worthy. Upon discovering this, Chyavan retaliated by creating the monster, Mada. Mada was said to have two sets of gigantic teeth and jaws, so enormous that one could engulf the earth while the other swallowed the heavens. 

Realising Mada was going to swallow the entire universe (including the gods), Indra surrendered and asked the sage to call off the beast. Chyavan agreed, under the condition that the devas allowed the Aswins to participate in his feast at Svarga, and so gain their rightful place among the devas.

See also 
Arishadvargas, six enemies
 Indra's major adversaries:
 Vritra
 Indrajit

References

External links 
 MahaBharat in Sacred Text.com Book 3 section 124 & book 14 section 9.

Asura